Gananatya, or Gananatya Sangha, which started the Gananatya Andolan (People's Theatre Movement), were a radical theatre group which attempted to bring social and political theater to rural villages in Bengal in the 1930s and 1940s.

References

Theatrical organisations in India
Bengali culture
Bengali theatre groups